A list of 1990s American television episodes with LGBT themes includes a number that engendered controversies relating to LGBT representation. With the exception of what would come to be known as "lesbian kiss episodes", in which a straight-identified female character exchanges an intimate kiss with a lesbian or bisexual character, who was generally never seen again, representation of same-sex sexual or affectional displays lagged well behind the behaviour in which mixed-sex pairs engaged. In addition to the controversy that surrounded the sight of two men in bed together on thirtysomething, controversies were generated around lesbian kiss episodes on L.A. Law ("He's a Crowd"), Roseanne ("Don't Ask, Don't Tell") and Picket Fences ("Sugar & Spice"). A similar controversy surrounded Fox's decision to cut a kiss between gay character Matt Fielding (Doug Savant) and a male guest star from an episode of Melrose Place (1994's "'Til Death Do Us Part"). The hesitancy about allowing any expression of same-sex affection on television even extended to the refusal of allowing same-sex couples having weddings or commitment ceremonies on series including Roseanne ("December Bride"), Northern Exposure ("I Feel the Earth Move") and Friends ("The One with the Lesbian Wedding") to kiss at the conclusion of the ceremony. During a period in network television history when producers were pushing the broadcast boundaries on sexually explicit content with such shows as NYPD Blue, the controversy over this and other television episodes that made inroads into presenting same-sex sexuality or affection led producers not to present any sexualization of their gay and lesbian characters. As noted by author Ron Becker, So viewers got to see Carol and Susan wed on Friends, but they didn't get to see them kiss. And fans of NYPD Blue could hear male hustlers talk about their johns, but the only sex they got to see involved the precinct's straight cops—naked butts and all. Clearly, chastity was the price gay characters paid for admission to prime-time television in the 1990s.

In 1997, "The Puppy Episode" of Ellen aired, in which lead character Ellen Morgan came out concomitant with series star Ellen DeGeneres coming out in her public life. "The Puppy Episode" was an enormous popular and critical success, drawing some 42 million viewers and winning two Emmy Awards and a Peabody Award. DeGeneres won a GLAAD Media Award in 1998. Ellen Morgan's coming out has been described as "the most hyped, anticipated, and possibly influential gay moment on television". The LGBT media watchdog group Gay and Lesbian Alliance Against Defamation (GLAAD) credits Ellen with paving the way for such LGBT-themed programming as Will & Grace (1998), The L Word (2004) and Ugly Betty (2006) and it has been suggested that Ellen and these other series presenting LGBT characters have helped to reduce societal prejudice against LGBT people.

Episodes

See also
 List of pre–Stonewall riots American television episodes with LGBTQ+ themes
 List of 1970s American television episodes with LGBTQ+ themes
 List of 1980s American television episodes with LGBTQ+ themes

References

Sources

Episodes with LGBT themes
American television episodes with LGBT themes, 1990-1997
Television episodes, 1990-1997
LGBT themes, 1990-1997
American television episodes, 1990-1997
1990s LGBT-related mass media
LGBT themes in fiction